Ledzokuku-Krowor Municipal District is a former district that was located in Greater Accra Region, Ghana. Originally it was formerly part of Accra Metropolitan District in 1988 (later as a sub-metropolitan district council on 2003), until the far eastern portion of the district was split off to create Ledzokuku-Krowor Municipal District on 1 November 2007 (effectively 29 February 2008); thus the remaining part has been retained as Accra Metropolitan District. However on 15 March 2018, it was split off into two new municipal districts: Ledzokuku Municipal District (capital: Teshie-Nungua) and Krowor Municipal District (capital: Nungua). The municipality was located in the central part of Greater Accra Region and had Teshie-Nungua as its capital town.

Population
As of 2010, it had a census population of 227,932.

Administration
The local authority of the district, the Ledzokuku-Krowor Municipal Assembly, is currently headed by Evelyn Naa Adjeley Twum-Gyamrah, who was appointed by the President of the Republic of Ghana in 2017 as the Municipal Chief Executive and serves as the political head of the district.

Administratively, the district is one of the 12 local authority districts of the Greater Accra Metropolitan Area, which include Accra Metropolitan District, Tema Metropolitan District, Ga South Municipal District, Ga Central Municipal District, Ga West Municipal District, Ga East Municipal District, Adentan Municipal District, Ashaiman Municipal District, La Nkwantanang Madina Municipal District, La Dade Kotopon Municipal District, and Kpone Katamanso Municipal District.

History 
Under the local government arrangements when the Accra City Council was created in 1953, six area councils were established namely Ablekuma, Ashiedu Keteke, Ayawaso, Okaikoi, Osu Klotey and Kpeshie (which comprised Teshie, Nungua and La). This system operated until 18 March 1989 when Accra was elevated to metropolitan district status and the area councils became sub-metropolitan district councils under Legislative Instrument 1500 of the new Local Government System (PNDCL 207) Act 462.

In 2003, part of the first schedule of the Accra Metropolitan Legislative Instrument of 1995 (LI 161) was amended and replaced with Legislative Instrument 1722 of 2003 which led to the creation of 7 more sub-metropolitan district councils out of the existing 6. The Kpeshie sub-metropolitan district council was split into the Nungua, Teshie and La sub-metropolitan districts; the Ablekuma sub-metropolitan district council was split into the Ablekuma North, Ablekuma Central, and Ablekuma South sub-metropolitan districts; the Ayawaso sub-metropolitan district council was split into the Ayawaso Central, Ayawaso East, and Ayawaso West sub-metropolitan district council; and the Okaikoi sub-metropolitan district council was split into the Okaikoi North and Okaikoi South sub-metropolitan district council. This intervention was informed by the need to break up the district into smaller sectors to facilitate good governance.

In 2007, to promote efficiency in the administrative machinery and also meet the ever pressing demands for amenities and essential services, the Teshie and Nungua sub-metropolitan district councils were merged and upgraded to a Municipal Status in 2007 as the Ledzokuku-Krowor Municipal District under Legislative Instrument 1865.

In 2017, the government laid before Parliament Legislative Instruments (LI) for the creation new districts. In the LI, the Ledzokuku-Krowor Municipal Assembly is to be split into the Ledzokuku Municipal Assembly and the Krowor Municipal Assembly.

Administrative area

Communities
The largest 20 communities in the district by population are:

Nungua
North Teshie
South Teshie
Teshie Nungua Estate
Teshie Camp
Teshie
Baatsonaa
North Nungua
Martey Tsuru
Adjorman
Greda Estates
Regimanuel Estate (East Airport)
Tsuibleo (North Teshie)
Okpoi Gonno
Kotobaabi

Electoral areas
The Ledzokuku Krowor Municipal District is made up of 24 electoral areas.

Demographics
At the 2010 census, there were 227,932 people residing in the district, out of which 26,621 were born elsewhere in the region, while 56,388 were born in other regions. The current population based Ghana Statistical Service record is 280,924. Migrants born in the Volta region have the largest proportion (34%) followed by those born in the Eastern region (23.6%).

The total household population in the district is 221,757, which comprises 60,859 households who live in the 21,366 houses within the district. The average household size in the district is 2.8 persons per household and the population per house is estimated at 10.4, indicating that compound houses are the most common type of dwelling (68.5%) within the district.

40.9% of the population were under the age of 19, 10.5% between 20 and 24, 10.7% between 25 and 29, 44.8% between 30 and 44, 12.1% between 45 and 64, and 3.3% age 65 and over. For every 100 females, there were about 91.9 males.

Governance
The Ledzokuku Krowor Municipal District is administered by the Ledzokuku Krowor Municipal Assembly.

The Assembly through the Local Government Act 1993 462 (section 10 sub sections 1,2,3,4 and 5), carries out the legislative, deliberative and executive functions of Government. These functions are summarized as follows:

 Provision of a sound sanitary and healthy environment
 Provision of educational infrastructure for first and second cycle schools
 Provision of markets and lorry parks within the Metropolis
 The planning and development control of all infrastructure within Accra
 Activities bordering on the maintenance of peace and security within the Metropolis
 Provision of public safety and comfort

These general functions are also reflected in the detailed 86 functions outlined in the second schedule of L.I. 1865, 2007 which established the Ledzokuku-Krowor Municipal Assembly. There are currently 38 Assembly members including the Municipal Chief Executive and two members of parliament for Ledzokuku and Krowor constituencies. The other 35 Assembly members are made up of 11 appointed and 24 elected members. Out of the 11 appointed members, the presiding member and 6 others are women while only two out of the elected 24 members are women. In all 7 out of the 38 Assembly members are women indicating only 18 percent participation level of women in Local governance at the Assembly level. This low level of women participation in governance indicates that more programmes needs to be put in place to encourage more women to participate in local level election. The elected Assembly members are from 24 electoral areas namely Tsuibleoo central, Tsui bleoo North, Teshie-Nungua North, Sutsuruno, Teshie-Nungua Estates South, Nii Laweh Blekese East, AddoGonno, Baatsonaa, Mukwedjor, Blekese West, Nii Odai Ablade, Nkpor, Kliowe Koo Naa, Sookpoti, OkpoiGonno, Aborlebu, Akror West, Okesekor, Tsuibleoo South, Antsewere Gonno, Akro East, Agblezaa and Nii Ashitey Akomfra.

Climate

LEKMA lies in the Coastal Grassland zone which experiences a double maxima rainy season pattern. 
The Ledzokuku Krowor Municipal District features a tropical savanna climate (Köppen climate classification Aw) that borders on a hot semi-arid climate (BSh). The average annual rainfall is about 730 mm, which falls primarily during Ghana's two rainy seasons. The chief rainy season begins in April and ends in mid-July, whilst a weaker second rainy season occurs in October. Rain usually falls in short intensive storms and causes local flooding in which drainage channels are obstructed.

Very little variation in temperature occurs throughout the year. The "cooler" months tend to be more humid than the warmer months. As a result, during the warmer months and particularly during the windy harmattan season, the district experiences a breezy "dry heat" that feels less warm than the "cooler" but more humid rainy season.

As a coastal district, Ledzokuku Krowor is vulnerable to the impacts of climate change and sea level rise. Drainage infrastructure is particularly at risk, which has profound implications for people's livelihoods, especially in informal settlements. Inadequate planning regulation and law enforcement, as well as perceived corruption in government processes, lack of communication across government departments and lack of concern or government co-ordination with respect to building codes are major impediments to progressing the development of the district's drainage infrastructure, according to the Climate & Development Knowledge Network.

As Ledzokuku Krowor is close to the equator, the daylight hours are practically uniform during the year. Relative humidity is generally high, varying from 65% in the midafternoon to 95% at night. The predominant wind direction in the district is from the WSW to NNE sectors. Wind speeds normally range between 8 and 16 km/h. High wind gusts occur with thunderstorms, which generally pass in squalls along the coast.

References

Districts of Greater Accra Region